The 1968 United States presidential election in Texas was held on November 5, 1968. All 50 states and the District of Columbia, were part of the 1968 United States presidential election. The state chose 25 electors to represent them in the Electoral College, who voted for president and vice president.

The Democratic Party candidate, incumbent Vice President Hubert Humphrey, very narrowly carried Texas with 41.14% of the vote, giving him the state's 25 electoral votes. However he narrowly lost the general election to Republican candidate, former Vice President Richard Nixon. This was the first occasion when Texas had not backed the winning presidential candidate since voting for John W. Davis in 1924. This is also the most recent presidential election in which Texas would back a losing Democratic candidate, and the penultimate time it voted Democratic.

Analysis
When Texas "favorite son" Lyndon B. Johnson withdrew from the 1968 election in March, it was generally thought that the Republican Party would have a good chance of winning the Lone Star State despite losing by 27 points in 1964 and the presence of former Alabama Governor George Wallace running as a candidate for the American Independent Party, a far-right political party. Wallace was known for his pro-segregationist politics, which would win him five southern states in the general election. However, in Humphrey's favor was the abolition of the poll tax via the Twenty-Fourth Amendment that permitted previously disfranchised Mexican-Americans to register and vote for the first time. The Mexican-American South Texas counties of Duval, Webb and Jim Hogg had been among the four most Democratic in the nation in 1964, and despite polling fewer than eighteen thousand out of a state total exceeding three million votes, those three counties would provide over thirty percent of Humphrey's margin and Duval was again the most Democratic county in the nation.

On September 21, a poll by Joe Belden gave Nixon and Humphrey each thirty percent of the vote and Wallace twenty-five percent. In the period between Belden's poll and the election, Wallace lost considerable support largely to Humphrey, owing chiefly to Democrat Preston Smith's "resolutely law-and-order" campaign for the governorship. This, along with strong loyalty of Texas Democrats much more conservative than the liberal Humphrey, was sufficient to allow the Democrats to carry the state. Exit polls suggest Humphrey gained a third of the non-Hispanic white vote in Texas, vis-à-vis around 25 percent in Virginia and less than 20% in all other southern states.

Wallace, who had been rivaling the two major party nominees in early polls, came in a distant third, with 18.97 percent of the vote, his lowest in any former Confederate state. Wallace did win 21 of Texas' 254 counties, which was enough for him to also carry one congressional district. Wallace's base of support was primarily in rural East Texas, which is more culturally tied to the Deep South than the rest of the state, although he did carry four counties in the West Texas region, with Loving County being the westernmost county in the country to vote for Wallace.

With his win in the Lone Star State, Texas was the only former Confederate State in 1968 to vote Democratic.

, this is the last occasion the following counties have supported the Democratic candidate: Blanco, Nacogdoches, Rockwall and Scurry. The 1968 election is also the last when the following Wallace counties have not voted Republican: Crane, Glasscock, Montgomery and Rusk. It was the only election between 1924 and 2012 when Val Verde County backed a losing presidential candidate.

This was the last time a Republican won the presidency while losing Texas. This was also the last time until 2008 that a Northern Democrat won any state in the former Confederacy when Barack Obama from the state of Illinois won Virginia, North Carolina, and Florida. Obama would later repeat his victories in both Virginia and Florida in 2012, while Hillary Clinton from New York won Virginia for a third straight Democratic victory in 2016. Joe Biden from Delaware would later narrowly win the southern state of Georgia (along with Virginia for a fourth consecutive Democratic win in the state by a wide margin) in 2020. 

This is also the most recent election in which a former Confederate State voted for a losing Democratic ticket that had no relations to the state. Georgia and Virginia supported a losing Democrat in 1980 and 2016, respectively, but 1980 Democratic presidential nominee Jimmy Carter was from Georgia, while 2016 Democratic vice presidential nominee Tim Kaine was from Virginia. Nixon had previously narrowly lost Texas to John F. Kennedy in 1960. In 1972, he sought re-election and won Texas with an overwhelming sixty-six percent of the popular vote.

Results

Results by county

See also
 United States presidential elections in Texas

Notes

References

1968 Texas elections
1968
Texas